Agent Anand Santosh is an Indian Telugu-language comedy thriller web series written by K. Subbu and directed by Arun Pawar. Created by Infinitum Media, the series stars Shanmukh Jaswanth, Pruthvi Mukka in the lead roles. The episodes premiered on Aha.

Cast 
Shanmukh Jaswanth as Agent Anand Santosh
Vaishali Raj
Alankrita Shah
Pruthvi Mukka as Agent Ayomayam
 Chandu JC
 Vishwa as Police (special appearance)

References

External links 

Indian television series
Telugu-language web series
Comedy web series
2022 web series debuts
Aha (streaming service) original programming
Thriller web series
Indian web series
Indian comedy web series
Indian thriller television series